Egweil is a municipality in the district of Eichstätt in Bavaria in Germany.

Mayor
2002-2014: Wunibald Koppenhofer
Since May 2014: Johannes Schneider (CSU)

References

Eichstätt (district)